The Central Corridor Rail Line is a proposed passenger service route between New London, Connecticut, and Brattleboro, Vermont. A primary purpose of the proposed service is to provide a rail link between 13 colleges and universities (including the state flagship schools UConn, UMass Amherst, and UVM) as part of the Knowledge Corridor.

Preparing the line for passenger service would require refurbishing the New England Central Railroad tracks, which also carry freight to New London's deepwater port. The northernmost section, in Vermont, has been upgraded to continuously welded rail via a $50 million ARRA grant. New England Central estimates that similar upgrades (which include upgrading the track to standard 286,000 pound car loads) from the Massachusetts / Vermont border to New London would cost $18 million, while the full project including stations and rolling stock would cost $150 million.

History

Previous service
The New London, Willimantic, and Palmer Railroad opened from New London, Connecticut, to Palmer, Massachusetts, in September 1850. It was extended to Amherst in May 1853 by the NLW&P-leased Amherst and Belchertown Railroad, which failed and was reorganized as the Amherst, Belchertown and Palmer in 1858. The New London Northern Railroad acquired the NLW&P (which had failed in 1859) in 1861, and the AB&P in 1864. In 1867, it extended the line north to Millers Falls.

In 1870, the Rutland Railroad leased an 1849-built Vermont and Massachusetts Railroad line from Millers Falls to Brattleboro, Vermont. Originally the V&M mainline, it became a minor branch when the V&M decided to expand west through the Hoosac Tunnel instead. Soon after, the Rutland was taken over by the Vermont Central Railroad, which then leased the NLN in December 1871. The VC collapsed in 1873 and was taken over by the Central Vermont Railway, which continued to lease the NLN.

The Central Vermont became part of the Grand Trunk Railway in 1899, which in turn was nationalized by the Canadian government in 1922. Passenger service on the line ended on September 27, 1947. The line was sold to RailTex in 1995 and operated as the New England Central Railroad. RailTex was merged into RailAmerica in 2000, which in turn was acquired by the Genesee & Wyoming company in 2012.

Montrealer and Vermonter

From its reinstatement in 1989, the overnight Montrealer (the direct predecessor of the Vermonter) ran along the Central Vermont from New London to Brattleboro and beyond. Amherst was at first the only station stop between New London to Brattleboro, which was traversed late at night in both directions; a stop at Willimantic, Connecticut, was added in 1991.

After fiscal issues in 1995, the Montrealer was cut back to St. Albans and moved to a daytime schedule as the Vermonter. It was rerouted over the Springfield Line between New Haven and Springfield, and the Boston Subdivision from Springfield to Palmer, Massachusetts. At Palmer the train reversed directions and continued north along the Central Vermont (which was sold to the New England Central Railroad that year).

On December 29, 2014, the Vermonter was rerouted onto the Conn River Line between Springfield and Northfield, Massachusetts, after the line received major upgrades. This eliminated the reverse move at Palmer, which will lead to faster service, and added stations at Holyoke, Northampton, and Greenfield; however, it ended direct service to Amherst.

Modern planning
During the building of Foxwoods Casino and Mohegan Sun Casino in the 1990s and 2000s, commuter rail service was considered on the New London to Norwich section of the line to reduce traffic impacts on Route 2. However, upgrades to Route 2 were selected instead.

In October 2012, an excursion train was run to raise support for the project, which has been endorsed by a number of the town governments along the line. In November 2012, officials from Mansfield, New London, Norwich, and Windham (all of which will be served by station stops) plus the Southeastern Connecticut Council of Governments signed an agreement to pursue funding for the service.

In January 2014, it was announced that backers of the line would try to seek federal funding in order to get the line funded. Congressman Joe Courtney is backing the project, along with Connecticut State Senator Cathy Osten. In September 2014, NECR was awarded a $8.2 million TIGER grant for upgrading 55 miles of track in Connecticut; the $10.5 million project is primarily for freight use but is also a prerequisite for any future passenger service.

In 2021, Connecticut lawmakers allocated $2.3 million for Connecticut Department of Transportation to study the expansion of the Shore Line East service east to Westerly, RI with the possibility of expansion north to Norwich, CT, with additional studies for infill stations along the two railways. The study is expected to be concluded in Fall 2023.

Rolling stock
Equipment is proposed to be refurbished 1950s Budd Rail Diesel Cars, which are less expensive to operate than conventional locomotive-and-carriage trains on lower-density routes like the Central Corridor. The refurbished RDCs would be capable of operating at speeds up to 80 miles per hour - the FRA limit on track speed on the corridor.

Station listing

References

External links

Passenger rail transportation in Connecticut
Proposed railway lines in the United States
Passenger rail transportation in Massachusetts
Passenger rail transportation in Vermont
Proposed railway lines in Massachusetts